Javier Jauregui Blanco (born 29 January 1975) is a Spanish former professional footballer who played as a goalkeeper.

Club career
Born in Tolosa, Gipuzkoa, Jauregui appeared in 277 Segunda División games over eight seasons, representing in the competition SD Eibar, Córdoba CF, Lorca Deportiva CF and Real Unión. On 22 June 1997, whilst a player of CD Logroñés, he played his first and only La Liga match, a 2–1 away loss against Real Sociedad.

Jauregui retired in June 2011 at the age of 36, after one year with amateurs SD Beasain in his native Basque Country.

References

External links

1975 births
Living people
People from Tolosa, Spain
Spanish footballers
Footballers from the Basque Country (autonomous community)
Association football goalkeepers
La Liga players
Segunda División players
Segunda División B players
Tercera División players
Tolosa CF footballers
CD Logroñés footballers
SD Beasain footballers
Racing de Ferrol footballers
SD Eibar footballers
Córdoba CF players
Lorca Deportiva CF footballers
Real Unión footballers